Rivière-Nouvelle is an unorganized territory in the Gaspésie–Îles-de-la-Madeleine region of Quebec, Canada.

It flows in a southerly direction through the middle of the territory until the Municipality of Nouvelle where its course changes to the south-east before emptying in Chaleur Bay. While its current name has been in use since the 17th century, the Mi'kmaq people called it Tlapatantjitjg, meaning "potatoes" (used metaphorically because of its rocky bottom).

Demographics

Population

See also
 Escuminac River
 Restigouche River
 Chaleur Bay
 List of unorganized territories in Quebec

References

Unorganized territories in Gaspésie-Îles-de-la-Madeleine